The 2015–16 Spartan South Midlands Football League season was the 19th in the history of Spartan South Midlands Football League a football competition in England.

Premier Division

The Premier Division featured 19 clubs which competed in the division last season, along with three clubs promoted from Division One:

 Bedford
 Broxbourne Borough
 Welwyn Garden City

Five clubs have applied for promotion to Step 4: AFC Dunstable, Berkhamsted, Hertford Town, Hoddesdon Town and London Colney.

League table

Division One

Division One featured 20 clubs in the division for this season, of which there are five new clubs.
Two clubs relegated from Premier Division:
Ampthill Town
Hillingdon Borough

Two clubs promoted from Division Two:
Brimsdown
New Bradwell St. Peter

Plus:
Broadfields United, promoted from Middlesex County League Premier Division

In addition, Bush Hill Rangers changed their name to Woodford Town.

League table

Division Two

Division Two featured twelve clubs which competed in the division last season, along with six new clubs:
AFC Hillgate, joined from the Middlesex County League
Amersham Town, relegated from Division One
Aylesbury reserves
Loughton Manor, joined from the North Bucks & District League
St Albans City reserves
Stony Stratford Town, relegated from Division One

League table

References

2015-16
9